The Africa Movie Academy Award for Best Actor in a Leading Role is an annual merit by the Africa Film Academy to recognize and reward portrayer by a male actor in a major role in a film.

References

Lists of award winners
Best Actor Africa Movie Academy Award winners
Film awards for lead actor
Africa Movie Academy Awards